Gertrude Barrows Bennett (September 18, 1884February 2, 1948), known by the pseudonym Francis Stevens, was a pioneering author of fantasy and science fiction. Bennett wrote a number of fantasies between 1917 and 1923 and has been called "the woman who invented dark fantasy".

Her most famous books include Claimed (which Augustus T. Swift, in a letter to The Argosy called "One of the strangest and most compelling science fantasy novels you will ever read") and the lost world novel The Citadel of Fear.

Bennett also wrote an early dystopian novel, The Heads of Cerberus (1919).

Life 
Gertrude Mabel Barrows was born in Minneapolis in 1884, to Charles and Caroline Barrows (née Hatch). Her father, a Civil War veteran from Illinois, died in 1892. Gertrude completed school through the eighth grade, then attended night school in hopes of becoming an illustrator (a goal she never achieved). Instead, she began working as a stenographer, a job she held on and off for the rest of her life.

In 1909 Barrows married Stewart Bennett, a British journalist and explorer, and moved to Philadelphia.  A year later her husband died during a tropical storm while on a treasure hunting expedition. With a new-born daughter to raise, Bennett continued working as a stenographer. When her father died toward the end of World War I, Bennett assumed care for her invalid mother.

Virtually all of Bennett's work dates from 1917 to 1920, when she began to write short stories and novels to support the household. She stopped writing when her mother died in 1920; one later work published in 1923 appears to have been written during the late 'teens, and submitted to Weird Tales when that magazine was just starting up.

In the mid-1920s, Bennett placed her daughter in the care of friends and moved to California. Because she was estranged from her daughter, for a number of years researchers believed Bennett died in 1939 – a 1939 letter from her daughter was returned as undeliverable, and her daughter did not hear from Bennett after this date. However, new research, including her death certificate, shows that she died in 1948.

Writing career 
Gertrude Mabel Barrows (as she then was) wrote her first short story at age 17, a science fiction story titled "The Curious Experience of Thomas Dunbar". She mailed the story to Argosy, then one of the top pulp magazines. The story was accepted and published in the March 1904 issue, under the byline "G. M. Barrows".  Although the initials disguised her gender, this appears to be the first instance of an American female author publishing science fiction, and using her real name. That same month, Youth's Companion published her poetry.

Once Bennett began to take care of her mother, she decided to return to fiction writing as a means of supporting her family.  The first story she completed after her return to writing was the novella "The Nightmare", which appeared in All-Story Weekly in 1917. The story is set on an island separated from the rest of the world, on which evolution has taken a different course. "The Nightmare" resembles Edgar Rice Burroughs' The Land That Time Forgot, itself published a year later. While Bennett had submitted "The Nightmare" under her own name, she had asked to use a pseudonym if it was published. The magazine's editor chose not to use the pseudonym Bennett suggested (Jean Vail) and instead credited the story to Francis Stevens. When readers responded positively to the story, Bennett chose to continue writing under the name.

Over the next few years, Bennett wrote a number of short stories and novellas. Her short story "Friend Island" (All-Story Weekly, 1918), for example, is set in a 22nd-century ruled by women. Another story is the novella "Serapion" (Argosy, 1920), about a man possessed by a supernatural creature. This story has been released in an electronic book entitled Possessed: A Tale of the Demon Serapion, with three other stories by her. Many of her short stories have been collected in The Nightmare and Other Tales of Dark Fantasy (University of Nebraska Press, 2004).

In 1918 she published her first, and perhaps best,  novel The Citadel of Fear (Argosy, 1918). This lost world story focuses on a forgotten Aztec city, which is "rediscovered" during World War I.  It was the introduction to a 1952 reprint edition of the novel which revealed that "Francis Stevens" was Bennett's pen-name.

A year later she published her only science fiction novel, The Heads of Cerberus (The Thrill Book, 1919). One of the first dystopian novels, the book features a "grey dust from a silver phial" which transports anyone who inhales it to a totalitarian Philadelphia of 2118 AD.

One of Bennett's most famous novels was Claimed! (Argosy, 1920; reprinted 1966, 2004, 2018), in which a supernatural artifact summons an ancient and powerful god to early 20th century New Jersey.  Augustus T. Swift called the novel "One of the strangest and most compelling science fantasy novels you will ever read".

Apparently The Thrill Book had accepted more of her stories when it was cancelled in October 1919, only seven months after the first issue. These were never published and became lost.  It has been hypothesized that "Sunfire", which appeared in Weird Tales in 1923, was one of these stories that had originally been accepted by Thrill Book; it was the only 'new' story published by Bennett after 1920, although it was almost certainly written in 1919 or earlier.

Influence 

Bennett has been credited as having "the best claim at creating the new genre of dark fantasy".  It has been said that Bennett's writings influenced both H. P. Lovecraft and A. Merritt, both of whom "emulated Bennett's earlier style and themes". Lovecraft was even said to have praised Bennett's work. However, there is controversy about whether or not this actually happened and the praise appears to have resulted from letters wrongly attributed to Lovecraft.

As for Merritt, for several decades critics and readers believed "Francis Stevens" was a pseudonym of his. This rumor only ended with the 1952 reprinting of Citadel of Fear, which featured a biographical introduction of Bennett by Lloyd Arthur Eshbach.

Critic Sam Moskowitz said she was the "greatest woman writer of science fiction in the period between Mary Wollstonecraft Shelley and C.L. Moore".

Because Bennett was the first American woman to have her fantasy and science fiction widely published, she qualifies as a pioneering female fantasy author.

Bibliography

Novels 
 The Citadel of Fear (1918; reprinted in Famous Fantastic Mysteries, February 1942, and in paperback form in 1970,[NY: Paperback Library], 1984[NY: Carroll & Graf], 2015[Armchair Fiction])
 The Labyrinth (serialized in All-Story Weekly, July 27, August 3, and August 10, 1918; later reprinted as a paperback novel)
 The Heads of Cerberus 1st book edition. 1952, Cloth, also leather backed, Reading, PA. Polaris Press (Subsidiary of Fantasy Fress, Inc.) ill. Ric Binkley. Intro by Lloyd Arthur Eshbach (Thrill Book, August 15, 1919; reprinted as a paperback novel in 1952 and 1984; Dover 2014; Modern Library 2019)
 Avalon (serialized in Argosy, August 16 to September 6, 1919; reprinted in Claimed! and Avalon, Black Dog Books, 2018)
 Claimed (1920; reprinted in April 1941, 1985, 1996, 2004, 2018) 192pp, cloth and paper, Sense of Wonder Press, James A. Rock & Co., Publishers in trade paperback and hard cover.

Short stories and novellas 
 "The Curious Experience of Thomas Dunbar" (Argosy, March 1904; as by G. M. Barrows)
 "The Nightmare," (All-Story Weekly, April 14, 1917)
 "Friend Island" (All-Story Weekly, September 7, 1918; reprinted in Fantastic Novels, September 1950; reprinted in Under the Moons of Mars, edited by Sam Moskowitz, 1970)
 "Behind the Curtain" (All-Story Weekly, September 21, 1918; reprinted in Famous Fantastic Mysteries, January 1940)
 "Unseen—Unfeared" (People's Favorite Magazine February 10, 1919; reprinted in Horrors Unknown, edited by Sam Moskowitz, 1971)
 "The Elf-Trap" (Argosy, July 5, 1919; reprinted in Fantastic Novels Magazine, November 1949)
 "Serapion" (serialized in Argosy Weekly, June 19, June 26, July 3, and July 10, 1920; reprinted in Famous Fantastic Mysteries, July 1942)
 "Sunfire" (1923; original printed in two parts in Weird Tales, July–August 1923, and Weird Tales, September 1923; also reprinted as trade paperback in 1996 by Apex International)

Collections 
 Possessed: A Tale of the Demon Serapion (2002; contains the novella "Serapion", retitled, and the short stories "Behind the Curtain", "Elf-Trap" and "Unseen-Unfeared")
 Nightmare: And Other Tales of Dark Fantasy (University of Nebraska Press, 2004; contains all Stevens' known short fiction except "The Curious Experience of Thomas Dunbar", i.e. "The Nightmare", "The Labyrinth", "Friend Island", "Behind the Curtain", ""Unseen-Unfeared", "The Elf-Trap", "Serapion" and "Sunfire")

See also 
 Feminist science fiction
 Women science fiction authors
 Women in science fiction

Notes

References

Further reading
 Cottrill, Tim. Bookery's Guide to Pulps & Related Magazines, 1888-1969. Bookery Press, 2005. Internet Archive.
R. Alain Everts. "The Mystery of Francis Stevens (1883–1948)". Outsider 4 (2000): 29–30.
Knight, Damon. “The Classics.” In Search of Wonder: Essays on Modern Science Fiction, Advent Publishers, 1967, pp. 9–11.
Kröger, Lisa, and Melanie R. Anderson. “Seer of the Unseen.” Monster, She Wrote: The Women Who Pioneered Horror and Speculative Fiction, Random, 2019, pp. 139–143. Google Books.
 Bryce J. Stevens. "Into the Abyss: Did Francis Stevens' 1920 Novel Claimed Influence H.P. Lovecraft?". Presents textual evidence that Claimed may have influenced "The Call of Cthulhu".
 Sam Moskowitz. "The Woman Who Wrote 'Citadel of Fear'". The Citadel of Fear by Francis Stevens. NY: Paperback Library, 1970.
Moskowitz, Sam, editor. Under the Moons of Mars: A History and Anthology of "The Scientific Romance" in the Munsey Magazines, 1912-1920. Holt, Rinehart and Winston, 1970. Internet Archive.
 Robert Weinberg. "A Forgotten Mistress of Fantasy". The Citadel of Fear by Francis Stevens. NY: Carroll & Graf, 1994.

External links 

 
 
 Francis Stevens at Manybooks.net
Complete text of The Citadel of Fear (1918)
 Modern review of Claimed.
 
 
Weird Tales Archive at Luminist Archives
Serialized issues with The Labyrinth at Luminist Archives

1884 births
1948 deaths
Writers from Minneapolis
American women short story writers
American science fiction writers
American fantasy writers
20th-century American novelists
20th-century American women writers
Women science fiction and fantasy writers
American women novelists
20th-century American short story writers
Novelists from Minnesota
Weird fiction writers